Mehmet Emin Erişirgil (1891 – 1 January 1965) was a Turkish teacher, writer and politician who served as Minister of Trade and Minister of Interior. Emin Erişirgil was a member of the commission involved in introducing the modern Turkish alphabet.

References

1891 births
1965 deaths
Ministers of the Interior of Turkey
Politicians from Istanbul
Schoolteachers from Istanbul